Opostegoides bicolorella is a moth of the family Opostegidae. It was described by Sinev in 1990, and is known from the Russian Far East.

External links

Opostegidae
Moths described in 1990